The following lists events that happened during 1829 in New Zealand.

Incumbents

Regal and viceregal
Head of State – King George IV
Governor of New South Wales – General Ralph Darling

Events 
29 November – Alfred Nesbitt Brown arrives in Paihia. He is the third ordained minister in New Zealand.

Undated
James Farrow, the first trader known to have frequented the Tauranga area, arrives for the first time. (see also 1838)
A whaling station is established at Preservation Inlet on the south-west corner of the South Island by Captain William Anglem.

Births
 14 February (in England): Richard Burgess, murderer.
 31 March (in England): Maria Rye, social reformer.
 30 April (in Germany): Ferdinand von Hochstetter, geologist.
 22 July: William Leonard Williams, Māori language scholar and Bishop of Waiapu.
 26 November (in England): Arthur Hamilton-Gordon, 1st Baron Stanmore, Governor of New Zealand.
Undated
 Frederick Joseph Moss, politician.
 (in England): Henry Richmond, Superintendent of Taranaki.

Deaths

See also
List of years in New Zealand
Timeline of New Zealand history
History of New Zealand
Military history of New Zealand
Timeline of the New Zealand environment
Timeline of New Zealand's links with Antarctica

References